The Welsh church may refer to:

Church in Wales
Roman Catholic Church in England and Wales

Individual churches outside Wales
Melbourne Welsh Church,  Australia
United Welsh Church, Blackstone, Australia
Welsh Church of Central London, United Kingdom

Salem Welsh Church, United States

See also
Christianity in Wales